Lipkovo is a municipality in the north part of North Macedonia. Lipkovo is also the name of the village where the municipal seat is found. Lipkovo Municipality is part of the Northeastern Statistical Region.

Geography
The municipality borders Serbia and Kosovo to the north, Čučer-Sandevo Municipality to the west, the City of Skopje to the southwest, Aračinovo Municipality to the south and Kumanovo Municipality to the east.

Demographics
According to the 2021 Macedonian census, Lipkovo Municipality has 22,308 inhabitants. Ethnic groups in the municipality:

Timeline of Lipkovo Municipality

Installation of Municipality
 1996  Municipality inaugurated

21st century
2000  Usamedin Alili elected Mayor
2001 Insurgency in the Republic of Macedonia
Operation MH - 2, Operation Vaksince, Kumanovo Water Crisis 2001, Operation Essential Harvest, Battle of Matejče, Battle of Slupčane
2002 Population: 27,058
2005  Bekjir Sakipi elected Mayor
2008 Northeastern Statistical Region formed
2009  Sadula Duraki elected Mayor
2011 Ismet Jashari monument built in Ropaljce
2012 Hospital built
2013  Sadula Duraki elected Mayor 2nd term
2015 Gošince attack

People
Ismet Jashari, from Orizari KLA fighter, KIA in Kosovo

Culture
 Matejče Monastery
 Halit Efendi Mosque
 Jusuf Efendi Mosque

References

 
Northeastern Statistical Region
Municipalities of North Macedonia